Daniel McAlister (born 22 August 1978 in New Zealand) is an Australian rules footballer notable for his brief appearance in the Australian Football League for the Essendon Football Club.

McAlister was born in New Zealand.  Of Māori heritage, he is one of few Maori Australians in the history of the VFL/AFL. McAlister grew up playing rugby union and rugby league as a junior in Taranaki. 
His family emigrated to Tasmania when Daniel was 12, and after starting as a boundary umpire he played junior Australian rules in Smithton before moving to Hobart where he was selected in the Under 18 state team.

The 185 cm, 88 kg solidly built McAlister played just six games in three seasons between 1997 and 2002. Originally drafted with pick 5 in the 1996 AFL Draft, McAlister was delisted after playing just two senior games. Surprisingly, he was re-drafted in the 2001 AFL Draft, picked up again by Essendon at pick #64. He was delisted at the end of 2002, after which he was signed to play for the Wodonga Raiders in country Victoria.

References

Living people
1978 births
VFL/AFL players born outside Australia
Australian rules footballers from Tasmania
Essendon Football Club players
New Zealand players of Australian rules football
Tassie Mariners players
Albury Football Club players
Wodonga Raiders Football Club players
People from Smithton, Tasmania
New Zealand emigrants to Australia
Australian people of Māori descent